The 2012 F.C. Tokyo season is the season in which F.C. Tokyo return to the J.League after their unexpected relegation following the 2010 season, making this their 12th top flight season overall. In addition, after winning the first Emperor's Cup in the club's history on January 1, F.C. Tokyo will also play the AFC Champions League, accompanied by the top 3 of the last J-League campaign at the highest club tournament in Asia. Kiyoshi Okuma and the club reached an agreement to end the contractual relationship that bound them together at the end of the 2011 season. With this, Ranko Popović became the new coach for this season.

Trophies balance

Competitive Balance

Winter transfers

In

Out

Loan out

Loan return

Loan end

Current squad
Updated to 4 February 2012

Match stats
Updated to 30 May 2012

Match results

Pre-season

Friendly matches

Fuji Xerox Super Cup

Final

J.League

 Win   Draw   Lost

 J.League Winner (also qualified for 2013 AFC Champions League Group Stage)
 2013 AFC Champions League Group Stage
 Relegation to J.League 2

AFC Champions League

Group stage

Round of 16

Emperor's Cup

Round of 64

J.League Cup

Quarterfinals

Semifinals

Goals

Last updated: 13 May 2012
Source: Match reports in Competitive matches

Kits

References 

FC Tokyo
2012